Palaeotodus is an extinct genus of todies in the family Todidae. The genus has at least three species known from fossils found in west-central Europe and western North America.

Species
The following species are classified within the genus:
†Palaeotodus emryi - Olson, 1976: Oligocene fossils found in Wyoming (U.S.A.). These remains indicate a larger size and proportionally larger wings than those of the modern todies
†Palaeotodus escampsiensis - Mourer-Chauviré, 1985: Upper Eocene fossils found in France
†Palaeotodus itardiensis - Mourer-Chauviré, 1985: Lower Oligocene fossils found in France

References 

Prehistoric bird genera
Prehistoric birds of Europe
Paleogene France
Fossils of France
Quercy Phosphorites Formation
Prehistoric birds of North America